McAfee is an unincorporated community located in Mercer County, Kentucky, United States. Its post office  is closed. It was also called Chaplin.

See also
National Register of Historic Places listings in Mercer County, Kentucky

References

Unincorporated communities in Mercer County, Kentucky
Unincorporated communities in Kentucky